Isabelle Cristina Retamiro Cruz (born December 21, 1997) is a Brazilian artistic gymnast. She participated at the 2014 World Artistic Gymnastics Championships in Nanning, China.

References

1997 births
Living people
Brazilian female artistic gymnasts
South American Games gold medalists for Brazil
South American Games silver medalists for Brazil
South American Games medalists in gymnastics
Competitors at the 2014 South American Games
Sportspeople from Rio de Janeiro (city)
21st-century Brazilian women
20th-century Brazilian women